Phasianotrochus sericinus is a species of sea snail, a marine gastropod mollusk in the family Trochidae, the top snails.

Description

Distribution
This marine species is endemic to Australia and occurs off Cockburn Sound, Western Australia.

References

 Thiele, J. 1930. Gastropoda und Bivalvia. pp. 561–596 in Michaelsen, W. & Hartmayer, R. (eds). Die Fauna Südwest-Australiens. Jena : Gustav Fischer Vol. 5.
 Ponder, W.F. 1978. The unfigured Mollusca of J. Thiele. 1930 published in Die Fauna Sudwest-Australiens. Records of the Western Australian Museum 6(4): 423-441

External links
 To Biodiversity Heritage Library (2 publications)
 To World Register of Marine Species
 

sericinus
Gastropods of Australia
Gastropods described in 1930